Jimmy Andersson (born 29 August 1989) is a Swedish professional ice hockey player. He is currently an unrestricted free agent who most recently played with Linköping HC of the Swedish Hockey League (SHL).

Playing career
Andersson made his Swedish Hockey League debut playing with HV71 during the 2007–08 Elitserien season.

During the 2018–19 season, on 27 December 2018, Andersson agreed to a three-year contract extension to remain with Linköping HC through 2022.

At the conclusion of his contract upon completion of the 2021–22 season, Andersson ended his five-year tenure with Linköping HC in leaving as a free agent.

International play
Andersson won bronze with the Swedish national under-18 team at the 2007 IIHF World U18 Championships.

Personal
Andersson is the younger brother of Emilia Andersson Ramboldt, three-time Olympian and former captain of the Swedish women's national ice hockey team.

References

External links

1989 births
Living people
HV71 players
Karlskrona HK players
Linköping HC players
IK Oskarshamn players
Swedish ice hockey forwards
Ice hockey people from Stockholm
HC Vita Hästen players